Tragocephala phidias is a species of beetle in the family Cerambycidae. It was described by Karl Jordan in 1894. It is known from the Democratic Republic of the Congo, Cameroon, and Gabon. It contains the variety Tragocephala phidias var. rohdei.

References

phidias
Beetles described in 1894